Mountaga Diallo (1942–4 September 2017) was a Senegalese diplomat and army general. He was an Ambassador of Senegal to Russia, presenting his credentials to Russian President Vladimir Putin on 17 February 2005 and died in office.
He previously served as the Force Commander of MONUC from 2000 to 2004.

References

1942 births
2017 deaths
Ambassadors of Senegal to Russia
Senegalese diplomats
Senegalese military personnel
United Nations military personnel